Czernichów  is a village in Kraków County, Lesser Poland Voivodeship, in southern Poland. It is the seat of the gmina (administrative district) called Gmina Czernichów.

The village has a population of 1,700.

References

Villages in Kraków County